Symche Trachter, full name Szymon Symche Binem Trachter (born 1890 or 1894; died 1942 at Treblinka extermination camp) was a Polish painter of Jewish descent.

In his youth he was a pupil of Jacek Malczewski in Cracow, one of the most famous painters of Polish Symbolism.  Subsequently he pursued his studies in Vienna in 1918, and in Paris in 1927.  He exhibited in Paris in 1930.  Symche Trachter was active at Cracow, and also participated in exhibitions organized by the Jewish Society for the Propagation of the Fine Arts.

During the Second World War he was interned in the Warsaw Ghetto, but continued his artistic activities even in detention, decorating with frescoes  together with another painter and fellow detainee, Feliks Frydman  the walls of the main reception hall within the seat of the Ghetto's Judenrat.  In 1942 he was deported by the Nazis from the Warsaw Ghetto on one of the first transports to the Treblinka extermination camp, where he was murdered in the Holocaust.

Bibliography
Michał Weinzieher, Symche Trachter, Paris (1930)
Michał Weinzieher, Introduction; in: Symche Trachter: katalog wystawy, Warsaw, Żydowskie Towarzystwo Krzewienia Sztuk Pięknych, 1930.
The Museum of the Jewish Historical Institute: Arts and Crafts, comp. & ed. I. Brzewska, et al., tr. B. Piotrowska, Warsaw, Auriga, Wydawnictwa Artystyczne i Filmowe (for the Żydowski Instytut Historyczny w Polsce), 1995.  .  (Unpaged.)
Jerzy Malinowski, Malarstwo i rzeźba Żydów polskich w XIX i XX wieku, vol. 1, Warsaw, Wydawnictwo Naukowe PWN, 2000.  .
Allgemeines Künstlerlexikon: die bildenden Künstler aller Zeiten und Völker, vol. 33, Munich, Saur, 2002.  Digital edition available online.
Adrian Darmon, Autour de l'art juif: encyclopédie des peintres, photographes et sculpteurs, Chatou, Éditions Carnot, 2003, page 110.  .  (With an extensive list of further sources on pp. 338339.)

References

External links 
 Trachter's works in Central Jewish Library

1890s births
1942 deaths
Year of birth uncertain
Artists from Lublin
People from Lublin Governorate
Polish painters of Jewish descent
Warsaw Ghetto inmates
Polish people who died in Treblinka extermination camp